Terek is a town and the administrative center of Tersky District of the Kabardino-Balkarian Republic, Russia, located on the right bank of the Terek River,  east of Nalchik. Population:

History
Founded in 1876, it was granted urban-type settlement status in 1945 and town status in 1967.

Administrative and municipal status
Within the framework of administrative divisions, Terek serves as the administrative center of Tersky District, to which it is directly subordinated. As a municipal division, the town of Terek is incorporated within Tersky Municipal District as Terek Urban Settlement.

Demographics
Population:

Ethnic composition
As of the 2002 Census, the ethnic distribution of the population was:
Kabardins: 82.8%
Russians: 12.0%
Ossetians: 1.3%
Other ethnicities: 3.9%

References

Notes

Sources

Cities and towns in Kabardino-Balkaria